Edward Hill (April 13, 1835 – October 23, 1900) was an officer in the United States Army during the American Civil War. He received the Medal of Honor.

Biography
Hill was born on April 13, 1835 in Liberty, New York.

On June 1, 1864, as the Captain of Company K, 16th Michigan Infantry during the Battle of Cold Harbor, Hill "led the brigade skirmish line in a desperate charge on the enemy's masked batteries to the muzzles of the guns, where he was severely wounded."

Hill survived and rose to the rank of lieutenant colonel. He was awarded the Medal of Honor on December 4, 1893.

Hill died on October 23, 1900, and was buried in Fredericksburg National Cemetery, in Fredericksburg, Virginia. His grave can be located in Section OS, Grave 2.

Medal of Honor citation
Rank and organization: Captain, Company K, 1 6th Michigan Infantry. Place and date: At Cold Harbor, Va., June 1, 1864. Entered service at: Detroit, Mich. Birth: Liberty, N.Y. Date of issue: December 4, 1893.

Citation:

Led the brigade skirmish line in a desperate charge on the enemy's masked batteries to the muzzles of the guns, where he was severely wounded.

See also

 List of Medal of Honor recipients
 List of American Civil War Medal of Honor recipients: G–L

References

External links
 

1835 births
1900 deaths
Union Army colonels
United States Army Medal of Honor recipients
United States Army officers
People of Michigan in the American Civil War
American Civil War recipients of the Medal of Honor